Sandro Penna (June 12, 1906 – January 21, 1977) was an Italian poet.

Biography

Born in Perugia, Penna lived in Rome for most of his life.

He never had a regular job, contributing to several newspapers and writing almost only poetry. His first poems were published in 1932, through the intervention of Umberto Saba. Openly gay, his works were largely marked by his melancholic view of homosexuality as emargination. Penna's economic conditions were often poor, and in his late years a group of intellectuals signed a manifesto in the newspaper  to help him.

His affection for young boys was reflected by the constant presence of young boys in his verses, as well as in his taking a 14-year-old streetboy from Rome, Raffaele, to the home he shared with his mother in 1956 and living with him, on and off, for fourteen years.

According to Pier Paolo Pasolini, Penna's poetry was made of "an extremely delicate material of city places, with asphalt and grass, whitewashed walls of poor houses, white marbles of the bridges, and everywhere the sea's breath, the  murmur of the river in which the trembling night lights reflect".

His controversial erotic love poems can be found in English translation in This Strange Joy (Ohio State University Press, 1982) and Remember me, God of Love (Carcanet, 1993).

An epigram of Penna's about the dark-skinned, dark-eyed, dark-haired Raffaele, scribbled on the back of his portrait by Tano Festa, reads:

Sandro Penna died in Rome in 1977.

Works
 (1956)
 (1958)
 (1970)
 (1976)
 (1980, posthumous)
Confused Dream (1988, New York & Madras: Hanuman Books, a translation by George Scrivani. )

References 

1906 births
1977 deaths
Italian male poets
Italian LGBT poets
Gay poets
Italian gay writers
People from Perugia
Analysands of Edoardo Weiss
20th-century Italian poets
Burials at the Cimitero Flaminio
20th-century Italian male writers
20th-century Italian LGBT people